Alacarte (previously the Simple Menu Editor for GNOME or SMEG) is a menu editor for the GNOME desktop, written in Python. It has been part of GNOME since the 2.16 release.

The menu "Places" is not available for editing.
You can edit the places menu somewhat with this: $gedit ~/.gtk-bookmarks,
or use gconf-editor (e.g. /system/storage/drives/_org_freedesktop_.../mount_options).

An alternative to Alacarte is MenuLibre.

References

External links
 Alacarte: GNOME's long overdue menu editor. By Bruce Byfield on September 19, 2006
 Customizing Menus. GNOME 2.14 Desktop System Administration Guide

GNOME Applications